The 1966–67 season was Mansfield Town's 30th season in the Football League and 6th in the Third Division, they finished in 9th position with 49 points.

Final league table

Results

Football League Third Division

FA Cup

League Cup

Squad statistics
 Squad list sourced from

References
General
 Mansfield Town 1966–67 at soccerbase.com (use drop down list to select relevant season)

Specific

Mansfield Town F.C. seasons
Mansfield Town